Leslie Keith Guice (born December 23, 1954) is the 14th president of Louisiana Tech University in Ruston, Louisiana. Guice, who holds a Ph.D. in Civil Engineering, succeeded Dan Reneau as the Louisiana Tech president after a long career at the institution as a student, professor, dean, and vice president of research.

Education

In 1976, Guice received his Bachelor of Arts degree in architecture from Louisiana Tech University. He remained at Louisiana Tech until 1978, when he received a master's degree in Civil Engineering and immediately moved to a position as an assistant professor in Tech's department of Civil Engineering. While still employed at Tech, he completed a Ph.D. in Civil Engineering at Texas A&M University in College Station, Texas.

Career

Not long after completing his doctorate, Guice was appointed the head of the Civil Engineering department. By 1999, he was the Dean of the College of Engineering and Science. In 2004, he became the Vice President for Research and Development, and on November 29, 2012, Guice was announced as the 14th President of Louisiana Tech University.

Personal life
Guice was inducted in 1978 into the Louisiana Gamma chapter of the Tau Beta Pi Association at Louisiana Tech University.

Guice has 3 sons - Chad, Kyle and Bret.

References

External links
Dr. Les Guice's Homepage at Louisiana Tech University

1954 births
Living people
Louisiana Tech University alumni
Louisiana Tech University faculty
Texas A&M University alumni
Presidents of Louisiana Tech University
American civil engineers
People from Ruston, Louisiana
Louisiana Republicans